South Korea, as Republic of Korea, competed at the 1984 Winter Olympics in Sarajevo, Yugoslavia.

Alpine skiing

Men

Biathlon

Men

Cross-country skiing

Men

Figure skating

Men

Women

Speed skating

Men

Women

References
Official Olympic reports

Korea, South
1984
Winter Olympics